The 2002 Arizona Diamondbacks looked to repeat as World Series champions. They looked to contend in what was once again a strong National League West Division. They finished the season with a record of 98–64, good enough for the division title. However, they were unable to defend their World Series title as they were swept in the NLDS by the St. Louis Cardinals in three games. Randy Johnson would finish the season as the NL Cy Young Award winner for the fourth consecutive year and become the second pitcher in history to win five Cy Young Awards after Roger Clemens.

Offseason
 October 29, 2001: Ken Huckaby was released by the Arizona Diamondbacks.
 January 9, 2002: Quinton McCracken was signed as a free agent with the Arizona Diamondbacks.
 March 24, 2002: Ernie Young was sent to the Arizona Diamondbacks by the St. Louis Cardinals as part of a conditional deal.

Regular season

Luis Gonzalez
During the 2002 season, Luis Gonzalez received publicity as a piece of gum chewed by Gonzalez during a spring training game was sold for $10,000 on April 15, 2002. The buyer was Curt Mueller, owner of Mueller Sports Medicine Inc., manufacturer of the gum, Quench.

Opening Day starters
 Danny Bautista
 Craig Counsell
 Steve Finley
 Luis Gonzalez
 Mark Grace
 Randy Johnson
 Damian Miller
 Junior Spivey
 Tony Womack

Season standings

National League West

Record vs. opponents

Roster

Transactions
 June 3, 2002: Ernie Young was released by the Arizona Diamondbacks.
 September 4, 2002: Félix José was purchased by the Arizona Diamondbacks from the Mexico City Reds (Mexican).

Player stats

Batting
Note: Pos = Position; G = Games played; AB = At bats; H = Hits; HR = Home runs; RBI = Runs batted in; Avg. = Batting average

Other batters
Note: Pos = Position; G = Games played; AB = At bats; H = Hits; HR = Home runs; RBI = Runs batted in; Avg. = Batting average

Starting pitchers
Note: G = Games; IP = Innings pitched; W = Wins; L = Losses; ERA = Earned run average; SO = Strikeouts

Other pitchers
Note: G = Games; IP = Innings pitched; W = Wins; L = Losses; ERA = Earned run average; SO = Strikeouts

Relief pitchers
Note: G = Games; IP = Innings pitched; W = Wins; L = Losses; SV = Saves; ERA = Earned run average; SO = Strikeouts

NLDS

St. Louis wins the series, 3–0

Farm system

References

External links
 2002 Arizona Diamondbacks at Baseball Reference
 2002 Arizona Diamondbacks team page at www.baseball-almanac.com

Arizona Diamondbacks Season, 2002
Arizona Diamondbacks seasons
National League West champion seasons
Arizonia